Jericho is an American Western film, produced by Black Night Productions and released in October 2000 starring Mark Valley and directed by Merlin Miller. The filming took place in Alamo Village, Highway 674, Brackettville, Texas, in the United States of America. Jericho, played by Mark Valley, wakes up with no memory, but it's apparent that he's quite skilled with a gun. He is befriended by Joshua (Leon Coffee), who appears to be his polar opposite: He's a black man and true believer in the Lord, whereas Jericho is white and doubtful of everything, especially himself. Side by side, they attempt to piece together the amnesiac's past, which may or may not have something to do with a robbery, and either way is somehow connected to a town that's also called Jericho.

Cast 
Mark Valley as Jericho
Leon Coffee as Joshua
R. Lee Ermey as Marshal
Lisa Stewart as Mary
Mark Collie as Johnny 'O
Morgana Shaw as Mildred Flynn
Buck Taylor as Pap Doolin

Reception 
Joe Leydon of Variety called it a non-P.C., bland throwback to Saturday matinee fare.

References

External links 
 

American Western (genre) films
2000 films
2000 Western (genre) films
Films shot in Texas
2000s English-language films
2000s American films